Mir Tariq Ali Khan Talpur is a Pakistani politician who has been a member of the Provincial Assembly of Sindh since August 2018.

Political career

He was elected to the Provincial Assembly of Sindh as a candidate of Pakistan Peoples Party from Constituency PS-50 (Mirpur Khas-IV) in 2018 Pakistani general election.

References

Living people
Pakistan People's Party MPAs (Sindh)
Year of birth missing (living people)